คุยม่วง is a subdistrict in the Bang Rakam District of Phitsanulok Province, Thailand.

Administration
The following is a list of the subdistrict's mubans (villages):

References

Tambon of Phitsanulok province
Populated places in Phitsanulok province